Lavendon is a village and civil parish in the unitary authority area of the City of Milton Keynes, Buckinghamshire, England.  It is the northernmost village in the Milton Keynes UA and South East England,near Olney, about  WNW of Bedford and the same distance NNE of Newport Pagnell.

Nearby places are Warrington, and Cold Brayfield in the Milton Keynes UA, and Harrold and Carlton over the border in Bedfordshire.

History
The village name is derived from a personal name and a place-name element from the Old English language (Lafan + denu), and means 'Lafa's valley'.  In the Domesday Book of 1086 the village was recorded as Lavendene and Lawendene.

At Castle Farm are the earthworks of a motte-and-bailey castle created in the twelfth century by de Bidun family as the headquarters of their barony of Lavendon. The castle was last recorded in 1232.

The village was once the location of a Premonstratensian abbey, founded between 1155 and 1158 by John de Bidun.  The abbey was suppressed in the Dissolution of the Monasteries in 1536. It stood at what is now Grange Farm.

The Earl of Gainsborough was patron of the parish church.

The village is on the route of the 1936 Jarrow March, there is a small plaque on the churchyard wall to commemorate this.

Modern Lavendon
The parish church is dedicated to St Michael, and there is also a Baptist Church that meets at the Union Chapel in the centre of the village.

The village has a combined school for children from reception (4 years) through to year 6 (11 years). It also has a village store and Post Office, an independent garage, village hall and two public houses, the Green Man and The Horseshoe. There is also a pre-school and a nursery.

The company Tusting has a small factory on Olney Road producing a wide range of luxury leather goods which are exported worldwide.

Note and references

External links

Villages in Buckinghamshire
Areas of Milton Keynes
Civil parishes in Buckinghamshire